Beware of Luxury is a 1663 oil painting by the Dutch painter Jan Steen, now in the Kunsthistorisches Museum in Vienna. 

The painting depicts a disorderly household given up to licentious or improper behaviour. In this context the word luxury in the title implies excess or self-indulgence. The individuals, mostly up to no good, are assembled in the composition in a roughly triangular formation fronted by the obviously loose-living young woman smiling flirtatiously at the viewer.

The canvas is a humorous illustration of a Dutch saying of those more ascetic times - ""In weelde siet toe..." - which in full loosely translates as "In good times beware the consequences". In this case the lady of the house has fallen asleep, allowing the other members of the family to take full advantage. Her husband in the foreground is carrying on a dalliance with the provocative young woman, who is holding a glass of wine between his legs. He is himself laughing off the admonitions of a nun or beguine. A younger child is helping herself to something from a cabinet and her young brother is trying out a pipe. The youngest child is playing with a string of pearls, the eldest son is playing a violin, the dog is on the table finishing off the meal and a pig has wandered into the room. 

Warnings of the consequences include the Quaker with a duck on his shoulder reading out pious texts and a basket of instruments of punishment hanging from the ceiling. The moral of the picture is clear - sinners guilty of the deadly sin of lust (an  uncontrolled desire for earthly pleasure) must expect some penalty.

Some of the themes of the painting are also to be found in Steen's humorous but moralizing painting The Effects of Intemperance.

References

1663 paintings
Paintings by Jan Steen
Paintings in the collection of the Kunsthistorisches Museum
Birds in art
Dogs in art
Musical instruments in art
Pigs in art